Kavi Bhushan (c. 1613–1715) was an Indian poet in the courts of the Bundeli king Chhatrasal and the Maratha king Shivaji. He mainly wrote in Brajbhasha interspersed with words from Sanskrit, Arabic and Persian languages.  He was a scholar poet of Anupras and Shlesh Alankar.

Early life 
Bhushan originally resided in the Tikwapur village in present-day Ghatampur tehsil, Kanpur district of Uttar Pradesh. He was the brother of the poets Chintamani and Matiram. Bhushan's original name is unknown. Kavi Bhushan ("Precious Poet") was a title given to him by the Rudra Pratap of Chitrakoot.

Chatrapati Shivaji Maharaj

He first met Chatrapati Shivaji Maharaj when the latter he visited Agra to meet the emperor Aurangzeb; thereafter, Bhushan was supported by Chatrapati Shivaji Maharaj. Bhushan later moved from Varanasi to Maratha Kingdom in the 1670s, and attended Chatrapati Shivaji's durbar (court).

Literary works 
 Shivaa Bhushan
 Shivabavani
 Chatrashaal Dashak
 Saaransh ki khani

References

External links
 Poems of Kavi Bhusan

 Alankar In Sanskrit

17th-century Indian poets
Indian male poets
Hindi-language poets
Year of birth unknown
Year of death unknown
Poets from Uttar Pradesh
17th-century male writers